The Evangelical Press Association is a professional association serving the Christian periodical publishing industry, including magazines, newspapers, newsletters, and content-rich websites. Its members produce some 200 periodical titles with a combined circulation of over 15 million. EPA is a religious and educational non-profit corporation under the laws of the state of California. It is managed by an executive director, who is responsible to a board of six directors.

Goals
The EPA seeks to promote the cause of evangelical Christianity and to enhance the influence of Christian journalism by:
 providing resources and training to enhance competency and effectiveness;
 promoting the highest standards of professionalism, accountability, and authenticity of viewpoint;
 fostering Christian fellowship among members of the Association;
 rendering practical assistance;
 stimulating mutual helpfulness among members;
 and encouraging high ethical and technical standards in the field of Christian journalism.

Beginnings 
In the fall of 1947, a handful of editors met at the convention of the National Sunday School Association and began to talk about an association of evangelical editors. Dr. James DeForest Murch, editor of United Evangelical Action, took the lead and called together a pro tem committee in Chicago on May 6, 1948. Thirty-five editors met at the Congress Hotel in Chicago. They officially organized the Evangelical Press Association, adopted the doctrinal statement of the National Association of Evangelicals and wrote the statement of purpose printed above. On April 4–6, 1949, the first annual convention of the EPA met in Chicago with 103 publications represented.

In September, 1951, the association mailed the first copies of a news service to its members. It was produced by volunteers who sent out ten releases in the first five months. In 1952 it became a weekly service with a subscription rate of $10 a year. That year also the association began its newsletter, Liaison. In 1954 the association adopted a code of ethics and began an awards program.

EPA has held an annual convention each year since 1949. The conventions were held in Chicago until 1957, then moved to a different city each year after that. The conventions were held in January until 1963 when the date was changed to April or May.

As the association grew, it demanded an executive secretary to carry on the administrative work and edit the news service. This became a half-time paid position. In 1978, the job of executive secretary was changed to executive director, and the director was charged with giving vision and leadership to the organization. The news service was licensed to an independent news organization, and in 1994 the news service was sold.

Programs and services 
Held each Spring, the annual convention is the focal point of the EPA year. The 3-day convention rotates among major cities throughout the U.S. The goal is to provide three days of learning, sharing, networking, and fellowship, as well as to conduct official association business.

EPA conventions offer speakers of national stature, the annual awards contest, the annual membership meeting and election, occasional tours, and a wide variety of workshops designed for editors, writers, graphic designers, photographers, social media managers, web content managers, and business personnel—from  beginners to veterans, and for both print and digital application.

EPA hosts two annual contests: the Awards of Excellence contest (for a publication as a whole) and the Higher Goals contest (for the individual pieces produced—writing, photography, design, etc.).

Other programs and services include press credentials, one-on-one publication critique, scholarships for undergraduate journalism students, an ethics committee to hear complaints, webinars, a legal hotline and various member benefits and discounts from selected suppliers.

Notes

Bibliography
Buursma, Bruce (1981). "Religious Publishers Unite to Fight US Budget Cuts." The Washington Post. April 10.
Carpenter, Joel A (1997). Revive Us Again: The Reawakening of American Fundamentalism. Oxford: Oxford University Press.
Coogley, John (1965). "Religion: Church Press." The New York Times. August 18.
Jostad, Erling (1990). Holding Fast/Pressing On: Religion in America in the 1980s. New York: Praeger.
Mattingly, Terry (1991). "Preaching to Poor Not Fashionable." St. Petersburg Times. May 11.
Sandeen, Ernest (1970). "Fundamentalism and American Identity." Annals of the American Academy of Political and Social Science 387.
Witham, Larry (1995). "Religious Press Thrives in Secular Media World." Washington Times. May 13.
Trouten, Doug (1999). "A Brief History of the Evangelical Press Association." Master's Thesis

External links

Arts and media trade groups